Mantsinsaari Island (also Mantsi) is an island on the North-East of Lake Ladoga in the Salmi settlement in the Pitkyaranta municipality in the Republic of Karelia. The island is nearly uninhabited.

Before World War II, the island was a part of the Salmi municipality in Finland, and it had 1,500 inhabitants. The island did not have a bridge, instead a cable ferry. The main sources of livelihood were cultivation and fishing.

Mantsinsaari Island had an artillery battery, two 152-mm Canet 45 coastal artilleries. During the Winter War, the artillery assisted Finnish troops in battles of the North of Lake Ladoga. The Red Army was unable to conquer the island.

References

External links
 

Uninhabited islands of Russia
Lake islands of Europe
Lake islands of Russia